Frankie's House is a 1992 instrumental album by Jeff Beck and Jed Leiber. The music was written for the soundtrack of an Australian TV mini-series of the same name about photojournalism during the Vietnam War.

Track listing
All tracks composed by Jeff Beck and Jed Leiber; except where indicated
 "The Jungle"
 "Requiem for the Bao-Chi"
 "Hi-Heel Sneakers" (Robert Higginbotham)
 "Thailand"
 "Love and Death"
 "Cathouse"
 "In the Dark"
 "Sniper Patrol"
 "Peace Island"
 "White Mice"
 "Tunnel Rat"
 "Vihn's Funeral"
 "Apocalypse"
 "Innocent Victim"
 "Jungle Reprise"

Original score produced by Jeff Beck and Jed Leiber

Recorded at Comfort's Place, Sevenoaks, East Sussex. UK.
Album co-produced by Leif Mases... Keys Programming and Studio Tech - Dave Saunders

References

Instrumental albums
1992 soundtrack albums
Jeff Beck albums
Television soundtracks